General Draper may refer to:

Alonzo G. Draper (1835–1865), Union Army brevet brigadier general
Dennis Draper (1875–1951), Canadian Militia brigadier general
Warren Fales Draper (1883–1970), U.S. Army major general and Deputy Surgeon General of the U.S.
William Draper (British Army officer) (1721–1787), British Army lieutenant general
William Franklin Draper (politician) (1842–1910), Union Army brevet brigadier general
William Henry Draper Jr. (1894–1974), U.S. Army major general

See also
Attorney General Draper (disambiguation)